Skala Oropou is a community in East Attica, Greece, on the South Gulf of Euboea, due north of Athens city center. Since the 2011 local government reform it is part of the municipality Oropos, of which it is a community. It is part of Athens metropolitan area.

Geography

Skala Oropou is a seaside town, situated on the south coast of the South Euboean Gulf. The town Nea Palatia is directly adjacent to its east. It is 8 km south of Eretria (on the island Euboea), and 38 km north of Athens city center. The Greek National Road 79 connects it with Motorway 1 (Athens-Thessaloniki-Evzones) near Malakasa. The mouth of the river Asopos lies between Skala Oropou and the western village Chalkoutsi. The community has a land area of 12.398 km² and a total population of 4,146 inhabitants (2011 census).

Subdivisions
Skala Oropou (pop. 1,430 in 2011)
Chalkoutsi (pop. 2,094)
Nea Politeia (pop. 622)

Historical population

References

External links
GTP Travel Pages (Community)

Populated places in East Attica
Oropos